Gabriel Milési (7 August 1947 – 19 March 2021) was a French journalist and writer. He was a Knight of the Legion of Honour and an Officer of the Ordre national du Mérite.

Publications
Jacques Delors (1984)
Les Nouvelles 200 Familles (1990)
L'homme qui dit non (1995)
Le Roman de l'euro
Les Dynasties du pouvoir de l'argent (2011)
Entreprendre à grands pas
La Vénitienne de Bonaparte (2013)
Venise trahie (2018)

References

1947 births
2021 deaths
French male journalists
Chevaliers of the Légion d'honneur
Officers of the Ordre national du Mérite